The 1995 Nebraska Cornhuskers football team represented the University of Nebraska–Lincoln and was the national champion of the 1995 NCAA Division I-A football season. The team was coached by Tom Osborne and played their home games in Memorial Stadium in Lincoln, Nebraska. The Cornhuskers scored 638 points (53.2 per game) while only allowing 174 (14.5 per game). Their average margin of victory was 38.7 points, and their lowest margin of victory, against Washington State, was 14 points.  The Cornhuskers successfully defended their 1994 national championship by defeating 2nd ranked Florida 62–24 in the Fiesta Bowl, at the time the second largest margin of victory ever between a No. 1 and No. 2 school (behind 1945 Army 48–0 over Notre Dame). The team is widely regarded as the greatest college football team of all time.

Before the season
Following the success of the 1994 season, in which Tommie Frazier  and Brook Berringer led Nebraska to its first national championship in over 20 years, the 1995 team was an improvement in nearly every facet. With a powerful rushing offense and a dominating defense, Nebraska captured its second consecutive national title. The 1995 season was the second of a record-breaking three national championships in four years, as the Cornhuskers won Tom Osborne's third title in 1997.

Schedule

1 Final Big 8 Conference football game.  The Big 8 absorbed four teams from the dissolving Southwest Conference after the 1995 season and became the Big 12 Conference.

Roster and coaching staff

Depth chart

Game summaries

Oklahoma State

No. 2 Nebraska started the year with a 64–21 win at Oklahoma State in the season opener for both schools. The Cornhuskers piled up 671 total yards and 513 rushing yards while allowing 282 total yards to the Cowboys. After fumbling on its first possession, Nebraska scored on the next eight. An explosive second quarter saw Nebraska take a 16–0 lead following a 29-yard interception return for a touchdown by reserve weakside linebacker Terrell Farley, a JUCO transfer who went on to become Big 8 Defensive Newcomer of the Year. Oklahoma State, which netted -15 yards on its first three drives, responded by taking advantage of one of the young Husker defense's early mistakes, as a draw play by running back David Thompson on third and 10 went 79 yards to the Husker 2-yard line. After a 2-yard touchdown run by Oklahoma State running back Andre Richardson, Nebraska scored on its next offensive play, an 80-yard touchdown from I-back Lawrence Phillips. Phillips later scored on a 27-yard run in the second quarter as the Huskers took a 36–7 halftime lead. Phillips finished the game with 153 yards on 12 carries. Nebraska quarterback Tommie Frazier made his first regular-season start since the previous September and played sharply, carrying 10 times for 64 yards and a touchdown while also completing 6 of 10 passes for 120 yards and another score. Early in the third quarter, Frazier hit wide receiver Reggie Baul down the sideline for a 76-yard touchdown. Early in the fourth quarter, touted freshman Ahman Green scored his first career touchdown on a 14-yard run. Nebraska had seven players rush for at least 30 yards, including five who rushed for at least 50. The game marked twenty-two straight wins for the Huskers over the Cowboys.

Michigan State

No. 2 Nebraska lost quarterback Tommie Frazier early in the second quarter with a bruised thigh, but still dominated Michigan State in East Lansing. The Cornhuskers outrushed the Spartans 552 to 45 and piled up 666 total yards to the Spartans' 335. Lawrence Phillips led all rushers with 206 yards and four touchdowns (three 1-yard scores and one 50-yard score off a direct snap play) on 22 carries. The Huskers also received strong rushing performances from Clinton Childs (eight carries, 83 yards), Ahman Green (four carries, 74 yards, one touchdown), and Jay Sims (one carry, 80 yards, one touchdown). Backup quarterback Brook Berringer replaced Frazier and completed 6 of 11 passes for 106 yards, including a 51-yard bomb to a diving Reggie Baul. The Nebraska defense recorded three sacks, two fumble recoveries, and one interception.

The game marked Michigan State's worst margin of defeat since a 42–0 loss to Michigan in 1983. It remains the most one-sided defeat in the coaching career of Nick Saban, who was in his first season at East Lansing.

Arizona State

Nebraska set a school record with 63 first-half points en route to a 77–28 victory over Arizona State. Back-up I-back Clinton Childs, starting in place of the suspended Lawrence Phillips, ran 65 yards for a touchdown on the game's first play from scrimmage. The Huskers gained 508 yards in the first half and finished with 686 for the game – 394 rushing and 292 passing. Arizona State added to the first half offensive fireworks as quarterback Jake Plummer found wide receiver Keith Poole for three touchdown passes. For the game, Nebraska quarterback Tommie Frazier completed 7 of 10 passes for 192 yards and two touchdowns while rushing for 35 yards and two more scores. Childs ran for 143 yards and two touchdowns before leaving the game in the second quarter with a sprained knee. Back-up Husker I-back Ahman Green ran for 111 yards and two touchdowns on 13 carries. Nebraska pulled in the reins on its offense in the second half but managed to get a defensive touchdown when linebacker Terrell Farley returned an interception 21 yards. The game was a source of a minor controversy as Sun Devils coach Bruce Snyder accused Nebraska coach Tom Osborne of running up the score after third-string Husker quarterback Matt Turman threw a 39-yard touchdown pass to wide-open reserve receiver Lance Brown in the game's final moments.

Pacific

Nebraska totaled 731 yards, the fifth-highest total in school history, on its way to a 49–7 win over Pacific. The Husker defense held the Tigers to 197 total yards and forced 11 punts. I-back Damon Benning, starting in place of the injured Clinton Childs, rushed for 173 and three touchdowns on 10 carries before leaving in the third quarter with a sprained ankle. I-back Ahman Green added 112 yards and two touchdowns on 15 carries. In all, seven Huskers rushed for at least 29 yards. Nebraska began substituting in the second quarter and eventually used 102 players. The Huskers had three drives stall inside the Pacific 30-yard line, including one that ended with Kris Brown missing a 30-yard field goal.

Washington State

Nebraska overcame an early deficit – in what ultimately proved to be the only time the Huskers would trail during the entire regular season – to beat Washington State 35–21. The Huskers took the opening drive inside the Cougar 10-yard line but fumbled away the scoring threat. Moments later, Cougar tailback Frank Madu ran past a Husker blitz for an 87-yard touchdown. Nebraska fumbled on its next drive as well but took a 20–7 halftime lead with two Tommie Frazier touchdown runs and two Kris Brown field goals. A 35-yard touchdown pass from Frazier to Mark Gilman extended the Husker lead to 35–14 before Washington State quarterback Chad Davis accounted for the final margin with a 30-yard touchdown pass to Shawn Tims. As the game ended, Nebraska's offense, by this point composed of reserves, fumbled the ball away for a third time inside the Washington State 5-yard line. Despite the early touchdown run by Madu and a stout Washington State rush defense that ranked fourth nationally entering the game, the Cornhuskers outrushed the Cougars 428–72. Tommie Frazier rushed for 70 yards and threw for 99, and Nebraska ended the game with 527. Reserve I-back Ahman Green finished the game with 176 yards and a touchdown on 13 carries. Husker sophomore defensive end Grant Wistrom had a breakout game, tallying four tackles for loss to lead the Blackshirt defense.

Missouri

Nebraska's Blackshirt defense forced five fumbles and recovered two of them, intercepted two passes, and held Missouri to 122 total yards in the Huskers' first shutout of the season. Missouri managed only 39 rushing yards on 39 carries. Husker linebacker Terrell Farley blocked a punt that led to a Husker safety. Meanwhile, the Husker offense tallied 475 total yards, with quarterback Tommie Frazier rushing for 71 yards and three touchdowns and passing for 133 and two touchdowns. Husker I-back Ahman Green, making his first start, rushed for 90 yards and a touchdown on 15 carries.

Kansas State

Using a combination of stifling defense, surprising passing, and strong special teams, no. 2 Nebraska jumped out to a 35–6 halftime lead over no. 8 Kansas State en route to a 49–25 victory. Sprung by a block by freshman defensive end Mike Rucker, Husker return man Mike Fullman took a punt back 79 yards in the first quarter to open the scoring. Nebraska later scored on a fumble recovery in the end zone by Jon Vedral, an interception return by backup lineman Luther Hardin, and two touchdown passes by quarterback Tommie Frazier. Frazier threw two more touchdowns in the second half, including a 32-yarder to a wide-open Vedral in the third quarter to give the Huskers a 42–6 lead. After three quarters, Kansas State had minus-4-yards rushing and only 128 total. Nebraska began substituting reserve players shortly thereafter, and the Wildcats rallied to put 19 fourth quarter points and pull within 42–25. Nebraska's starters re-emerged and drove for another touchdown, the final score of the game. Despite the strong fourth quarter, the Wildcats finished with just 256 total yards and minus-19 rushing yards, while the Nebraska defense recorded eight sacks and two interceptions. Frazier was 10 of 16 through the air for 148 yards and four touchdowns. Ahman Green ran for 109 yards on 22 carries and caught two touchdowns.

Kansas State went on to finish second nationally in scoring defense; more than a third of the 145 points that the Wildcats allowed during the regular season were scored by the Huskers.

Colorado

Nebraska scored on a 57-yard run by I-back Ahman Green on its first play from scrimmage, committed no turnovers or penalties, and never trailed during a 44–21 win at no. 7 Colorado. Quarterback Tommie Frazier threw for a career-high 241 yards on 14 of 23 passing with two touchdowns (a 52-yarder to Clester Johnson in the first quarter and a 7-yarder to Jon Vedral in the second) and ran for 40 yards and a touchdown on 13 carries. Colorado quarterback John Hessler was 21 of 43 for 276 yards but threw two interceptions that led to 10 Husker points, and the Buffaloes were flagged 12 times for 92 yards. After Nebraska took a 31–14 halftime lead, Colorado scored on a 49-yard pass from Hessler to James Kidd on 4th and 2 to pull within 31–21. But the Buffaloes came no closer, as two field goals by Kris Brown and Frazier's touchdown run put the game away. Green finished the game with 97 yards and two touchdowns on 18 carries. One of the game's most memorable plays came when Colorado defensive end Greg Jones hit Frazier in the backfield. Frazier, who famously was not sacked during the entire 1995 season, absorbed the blow and completed a 35-yard pass down the sideline to Ahman Green on a drive that ended in a Husker field goal. On the day, Nebraska outgained the Buffaloes 467 to 382 and outrushed them 226 to 106.

Iowa State

No. 1 Nebraska scored on its first ten possessions and posted 624 rushing yards (second-most in school history) and 776 total yards (fifth-most in school history) in a 73–14 win over the Cyclones. Freshman I-back Ahman Green led the way with 176 rushing yards and three touchdowns on 12 carries and added a touchdown reception. A 64-yard touchdown run by Green in the third quarter marked the team's sixth one-play touchdown drive of the season. The game marked the return of Lawrence Phillips, who gained 68 yards on 12 carries. Tommie Frazier rushed for 62 yards and two touchdowns on eight carries and threw for 118 yards and two more touchdowns on 10 of 15 passing. Nebraska's defense limited Iowa State to 254 total yards, which included 121 yards on 28 carries by Heisman Trophy candidate Troy Davis. The Blackshirts also recorded two interceptions and forced two fumbles, recovering one.

The 73 points were the most ever scored by Nebraska against Iowa State until the Cornhuskers scored 77 against the Cyclones in 1997.

Kansas

No. 10 Kansas, unbeaten at home on the season and featuring its best team since it last beat the Cornhuskers in 1968, outplayed Nebraska for much of the first half. By the end of the first half, Kansas had outgained Nebraska 199–110 in yards, had 10 more first downs, and had run 23 more plays. However, Nebraska led 14–3 at intermission after recovering a muffed punt in the end zone for one touchdown and recovering a fumble near the Jayhawks' red zone for another. Kansas repeatedly drove deep into Nebraska territory but committed five turnovers. The Jayhawks' only points came on a field goal after an 86-yard drive stalled at the 2-yard line. Nebraska took over in the second half, and an 86-yard interception return by reserve defensive back Mike Fullman closed the scoring at 41–3. Tommie Frazier led all rushers with 99 yards on 10 carries; Kansas as a team ran for 72 yards on 32 rushing attempts. The Nebraska offense had three uncharacteristic turnovers, the first of which – a fumble by backup quarterback Brook Berringer – snapped a streak of 18 straight quarters without a turnover.

The game marked Nebraska's third win over a top ten team in less than a month, with an average victory margin of 45–16. With the win, Nebraska clinched the final Big 8 football championship, its fifth in a row.

Oklahoma

Nebraska entered favored by more than 30 points, one of the largest point spreads in the history of the series. But the Sooners played tough defensively, as Nebraska failed to score a first-half touchdown on offense for the first time all season. The Huskers nonetheless led 13–0 at halftime, thanks to a pair of field goals by Kris Brown and a 36-yard interception return for a score by linebacker Jamel Williams. A 57-yard fumble return by free safety Tony Veland pushed the score to 20–0 early in the third quarter. Frazier went 12 of 25 for 136 passing yards with one touchdown and one interception; the unspectacular performance likely factored into his finishing second in the Heisman Trophy voting behind Ohio State running back Eddie George. Late in the game, backup quarterback Brook Berringer scrambled to convert a long fourth down; during the same drive, reserve fullback Joel Mackovicka scored the game's final touchdown. The Husker offense finished with 271 rushing yards and 407 total. The Husker defense, meanwhile, limited the Sooners to 241 total yards and forced three turnovers. The game marked Nebraska's first shutout of Oklahoma since 1942. At the time, the game was also the second-largest victory ever by the Huskers over the Sooners (44–6, 1928).

The game stretched the Huskers' conference unbeaten streak to 23 games and completed three straight undefeated regular seasons. Nebraska ended the regular season averaging 52.4 points per game, which set an all-time school record and a modern-era college football record. It was the final conference football game for the Big Eight Conference, whose members would join with four members of the Southwest Conference to form the Big 12 the next season.

Florida

Entering the 1996 Fiesta Bowl, Nebraska had won 24 consecutive games, but some (including Sports Illustrated in their 12/26/1995 issue) still picked Florida to win the game due to the no. 2 Gators' overwhelming speed on both sides of the ball, even though oddsmakers had made Nebraska a substantial favorite. Florida coach Steve Spurrier's "Fun 'n' Gun" offense, led by future Heisman Trophy winner Danny Wuerffel, provided a stark contrast Tom Osborne's I-form power option.

Nebraska defeated Florida 62–24, marking the largest margin of victory and highest score in a national championship game in history. Included among several NCAA bowl records the Huskers set was a rushing total of 524 yards (out of an offensive output of 629 yards). I-back Lawrence Phillips carried 25 times for 165 yards and two touchdowns and caught a 16-yard touchdown. Quarterback Tommie Frazier finished the game with 199 yards on 16 carries. The game also included one of the most famous plays in college football history: a 75-yard touchdown run in the third quarter by Frazier in which he broke no fewer than seven tackles. Florida had won every one of their first 12 games by double digits and the Gator offense averaged over 44 points, 360 passing yards, and 534 yards of total offense per game. The Nebraska defense limited the Gators to 269 yards of offense and -28 rushing yards while registering a safety, seven quarterback sacks, and three interceptions, including one returned 42 yards for a touchdown by Michael Booker. The Huskers' 29 points in the second quarter set a Fiesta Bowl record.

Rankings

Legacy
Due to their performance against Florida, victories over four teams that finished in the top 10 (by an average score of 49–18), consistent dominance (smallest margin of victory was 14 points, trailed only once all season, rushed for 51 touchdowns and 400 yards per game while allowing only 6 rushing touchdowns all season and 78 rushing yards per game), their record-setting offensive performance, and their statistically impressive defense throughout the season, the 1995 Nebraska Cornhuskers are widely regarded as the greatest team in college football history.  The team set Division I-A records by averaging 7.0 yards per rushing attempt, allowing zero quarterback sacks, and allowing five punt returns (for 12 yards) over the entire season. The Cornhuskers average margin of victory was over 38 points, the largest of any Division I-A team since World War II, despite regularly resting starters after halftime. Analysts often make comparisons to other recent highly regarded champions, such as the 2001 Miami Hurricanes and the 2004 USC Trojans.  Such comparisons, as noted by the experts themselves, are nearly impossible to make, as rankings vary from evaluation to evaluation. The 1994 and 1995 Nebraska teams, which went a combined 25–0, remain the only undefeated and untied back-to-back national champions since Oklahoma in 1955 and 1956.  In 2011, the 1995 Cornhuskers were named by Playboy Magazine as the greatest college football team of the Playboy era (since 1957).  Nebraska won the final Big Eight Conference football championship in 1995, as the league expanded to form the Big 12 Conference the following season.

Awards

NFL and pro players
The following Nebraska players who participated in the 1995 season later moved on to the next level and joined a professional or semi-pro team as draftees or free agents.

References

Nebraska
Nebraska Cornhuskers football seasons
College football national champions
Big Eight Conference football champion seasons
Fiesta Bowl champion seasons
College football undefeated seasons
Nebraska Cornhuskers football